CPBL recognizes wins champions in each season.

Champions

External links

Chinese Professional Baseball League lists
Chinese Professional Baseball League awards